Jocelyn Rae and Anna Smith were the defending champions, but lost to Nao Hibino and Emily Webley-Smith in the quarterfinals.

Hibino and Webley-Smith won the title, defeating Nicha Lertpitaksinchai and Peangtarn Plipuech in the final, 6–2, 6–2.

Seeds

Draw

References 
 Main Draw

Kentucky Bank Tennis Championships - Women's Doubles
2015 WD